La Tosca is a 1909 French film directed by André Calmettes and Charles le Bargy.

Cast  
 Cécile Sorel: Floria Tosca, a famous opera singer 	
 René Alexandre:  Mario Cavaradossi, a painter and supporter Bonapartist her young lover
 Charles le Bargy: the Baron Scarpia, the ruthless police chief of Rome
 Charles Mosnier: Cesare Angelotti, the leader of the opposition arrested by Scarpia

References 
 "The Moving Picture World", USA, 5 June 1909
 Henri Bousquet, "Catalogue Pathé des années 1896 à 1914 (1907-1908-1909), Edition Henri Bousquet, Paris, 1993, 256 pages, page 172,

External links 
 

French silent short films
French black-and-white films
Films based on La Tosca
Films set in the 1800s
Films set in Rome
1900s French films